Phoebus James Dhrymes (October 1, 1932 – April 8, 2016) was a Cypriot American econometrician. He was a professor of economics at Columbia University. Dhrymes made substantial contributions to econometric theory through journal articles and textbooks.

Born on Cyprus, Dhrymes arrived in the United States in 1951, settling with relatives in New York City. After a few months, he volunteered to be drafted into the US Army for a two-year tour of duty, and afterwards attended the University of Texas at Austin on the G.I. Bill. In 1961 he earned his Ph.D. from Massachusetts Institute of Technology under supervision of Edwin Kuh and Robert Solow. He was appointed associate professor at the University of Pennsylvania in 1963 and became a full professor in 1967. Since 1973, he had been a professor at Columbia University.

He died on April 8, 2016.

Selected publications

References

External links 
 Website at Columbia University

1932 births
2016 deaths
American economists
American people of Cypriot descent
American people of Greek Cypriot descent
Cypriot emigrants to the United States
University of Texas at Austin College of Liberal Arts alumni
Massachusetts Institute of Technology alumni
Columbia University faculty
Fellows of the Econometric Society